The year 1862 in architecture involved some significant architectural events and new buildings.

Buildings and structures

Buildings opened
 May 8 – Church of St Philip and St James, Oxford, designed by George Edmund Street.
 May 12 – Ulster Hall, Belfast, designed by William J. Barre.
 May 17 – Teatro Comunale Florence, Italy.
 November 19 – Brekke Church, Norway, designed by Christian Henrik Grosch.

Buildings completed

 Flushing Town Hall, Flushing, Queens, New York, USA.
 Iron Clad Building, Cooperstown, New York, USA, designed by James Bogardus.
 Laxmangarh Fort, Rajasthan, India.
 Peace College Main Building, Raleigh, North Carolina, USA.
 Propylaea (Munich), designed by Leo von Klenze.
 Rila Monastery, Bulgaria, by Alexi Rilets (reconstruction).
 Government House, Queensland, Brisbane, Australia, designed by Charles Tiffin.
 Treasury Building, Melbourne, Australia, designed by J. J. Clark in 1857 (when he was 19).
 Great Malvern railway station, England, designed by E. W. Elmslie.
 Bow Bridge (Central Park), New York, designed by Calvert Vaux.

Awards
 RIBA Royal Gold Medal – Robert Willis.
 Grand Prix de Rome, architecture: .

Births
 February 7 – Bernard Maybeck, American Arts and Crafts architect (died 1957)
 February 19 – Lev Kekushev, Russian Art Nouveau architect (died 1916–1919?)
 May 28 – Theodor Fischer, German architect (died 1938)
 June 9 – Herbert Baker, English architect working in South Africa (died 1946)
 October 21 – Folke Zettervall, Swedish architect (died 1955)
 October 31 – Gerald Horsley, British architect (died 1917)
 December 7 – Hans-Georg Tersling, Danish architect working in France (died 1920)

Deaths
 June 27 – John Henderson, Scottish ecclesiastical architect (born 1804)
 December – Thomas Oliver, English classical architect (born 1791)
 Thomas Ellis Owen, English architect working chiefly around Southsea (born 1805)

References

Architecture
Years in architecture
19th-century architecture
Architecture